The Open Configuration and Management Layer (OCML) is a universal application configuration and management layer that helps to develop integrated applications independent of underlying group of applications, configurations and management.

Products using OCML
 FMG - Fossmart Mail Guardian
 Fosswall - Unified Threat Management System

References

Modeling languages